Uthiri Pookal is a 2011 Tamil-language soap opera that aired on Sun TV from 14 November 2011 to 4 October 2013 on Monday through Friday at 06:30PM (IST) for 476 episodes. It had been receiving the highest ratings of Tamil serials and received high praising from viewers.

The show starring by Chetan, Vadivukkarasi, Maanasa Hemachandran, Sharavan, Karna, Sadhasivam, Harikrishnan and producer by Home Movie Makers Sujataa Vijaykumar, K.Vijaykumar and directed by E. Vikkiramaathithan. It is the story of a good individual who adopts three children and brings them up with care and affection. It was also aired in Sri Lanka Tamil Channel on Shakthi TV. The show was re-telecastied from March 1, 2021, to March 25, 2022, at 09:00AM (Indian Standard Time).Chetan's performance as Sivanesan was highly praised by the viewers and the show received highest ratings at 6.30 pm slot.Chetan won the Tamil Nadu state award for his portrayal of Sivanesan.Uthiripookal was selected as best serial of 2012 and won the Tamil Nadu state award.

Cast
Main Cast
 Chetan as Sivanesan
 Vadivukkarasi as Alamelu
 Manasa as Sakthi
 Shravan as Lakshmipathy

Additional Cast
 Akila as sushi
 Shamilly Sugumar as Megha
 Harikrishnan as Dilipan
 L.Raja as dhakshinamoorthy
 Srilekha as Valliammai
 Revathypriya as Karuna
 Nithya Ravindran as Manonmani
 Dev Anand as Sathish
 Shyaam as Elango
 Shabnam as Shalini
 Mahalakshmi as Priya
 Bharathy as Bhagya Lakshmi
 Roopa Shree as Jamuna
 Srirubi as Nila
 Swetha as Suguna
 Revathi Priya as Karuna 
 Karna as Sadhasivam
 Sadhasivam as Pandi durai

Awards and nominations

Original soundtrack

Title song
It was shot in a different manner as a Terukkuttu (a popular art form in Tamil Nadu)
The title track was composed by Ilakkiyan and was sung by popular playback singer Solar Sai. The lyrics for the title track were written by Yugabharathi. Rest of the music for this serial was provided by Kiran.

Production
The series was directed by E. Vikkiramaathithan. It was produced by Home Movie Makers Sujataa Vijaykumar, K.Vijaykumar, along with the production crew of 2002-2016 Sun TV Serials Manaivi and Madhavi.

International broadcast
The Series was released on 14 November 2011 on Sun TV, the series also airs on Sun TV HD. The Show was also broadcast internationally on Channel's international distribution. It aired in Sri Lanka, South East Asia, Middle East, United States, Canada, Europe, Oceania, South Africa and Sub Saharan Africa on Sun TV. The show's episodes were released on YouTube channel Home Movie Makers, Mango TV and Tamil Serials.
  In Sri Lanka Tamil Channel on Shakthi TV.

Remake
The series has been remade into in Telugu language as Maa Nanna which aired on Gemini TV in 2012.

See also
 List of programs broadcast by Sun TV
 List of TV shows aired on Sun TV (India)

References

External links
 Official Website 
 Sun TV on YouTube
 Sun TV Network 
 Sun Group 

Sun TV original programming
2010s Tamil-language television series
2011 Tamil-language television series debuts
Tamil-language television shows
2013 Tamil-language television series endings